The Arcturus Formation is a geologic formation in Nevada and Utah, United States. It preserves fossils dating back to the Permian period.

See also

 List of fossiliferous stratigraphic units in Nevada
 List of fossiliferous stratigraphic units in Utah
 Paleontology in Nevada
 Paleontology in Utah

References

Permian geology of Nevada
Permian geology of Utah